Voronkov (a common Slavic family name, e.g.), from "Ворон" "Voron", meaning "raven" and may refer to:

 Andrei Voronkov, an academic involved with automated reasoning
 Ihor Voronkov (born 1981), Ukrainian professional footballer
 Mitrofan Voronkov (1868–?), Russian politician
 Viktor Voronkov (born 1974), Russian professional footballer
 Vladimir Voronkov (born 1944), Russian skier
 Vladimir Ivanovich Voronkov (born 1953), Russian diplomat
 Vladimir Romanovich Voronkov (1920–2012 ), Soviet colonel and Hero of the Soviet Union

Russian-language surnames